Mazus pumilio, commonly known as the swamp mazus, is a plant native to eastern Australia, Tasmania and New Zealand. It is commonly cultivated as an ornamental plant, most oftenly for creating a groundcover. It is a completely prostrate, perennial herb usually forming wide spreading patches.

References

External links

PlantNet: Mazus pumilio — photo

pumilio
Lamiales of Australia
Flora of New South Wales
Flora of Queensland
Flora of Tasmania
Flora of Victoria (Australia)
Garden plants of Australia
Groundcovers
Plants described in 1810